Argyresthia mariana, the graybanded leafroller, is a moth of the family Yponomeutidae. The species was first described by Thomas Nesbitt Freeman in 1972. It is found in Canada in northern Ontario and possibly Alberta.

The wingspan is 7-8.5 mm. The forewings are pale, shiny golden yellow. The hindwings are whitish. Adults are on wing from mid to late June.

The larvae feed on Picea mariana. They bore into their host plant, starting near the base of a twig and moving toward and into the bud. Near the base of the bud an exit hole is cut where pupation takes place in the fall. Adults emerge the following summer after overwintering.

References

Moths described in 1972
Argyresthia
Moths of North America